Alfie Hewett and Gordon Reid defeated the defending champion Nicolas Peifer and his partner Stéphane Houdet in the final, 4–6, 6–1, 7–6(8–6) to win the gentlemen's doubles wheelchair tennis title at the 2016 Wimbledon Championships. It was Hewett's maiden major title.

Gustavo Fernández and Peifer were the defending champions, but did not participate together. Fernández partnered Joachim Gérard, but was defeated by Hewett and Reid in the semifinals.

Seeds

  Stéphane Houdet /  Nicolas Peifer (final)
  Alfie Hewett /  Gordon Reid (champions)

Draw

Finals

References
WC Men's Doubles

Men's Wheelchair Doubles
Wimbledon Championship by year – Wheelchair men's doubles